Zuiderburen was an art exhibition held at the Mauritshuis, The Hague, Netherlands. The theme was Portraits from Flanders 1400–1700. The exhibition ran from 7 September 2017 to 14 January 2018. The official name of the exhibition in English is Neighbours; a precise translation would be Southern Neighbours.

Reviews were largely favourable; the NRC newspaper gave it four out of five stars, noting that it "was a beautiful selection but too limited to be representative of three centuries." The Volkskrant newspaper also gave it four stars.

References

Art exhibitions in the Netherlands
2018 in art
2018 in the Netherlands